Newport Wasps were a British motorcycle speedway team based in Newport, South Wales from 1964 to 2012. They were the 1999 Conference League champions. The Wasp logo incorporates the traditional black and amber colours of the City of Newport.

History

1964–1977
Newport Wasps first competed in the 1964 Provincial Speedway League (division 2), they finished a creditable fourth and also won the division 2 version of the Knockout Cup, when winning the Provincial League Knockout Cup during their debut season. 

The following season they joined the inaugural British League season (the top division) and would remain in the top division until 1977. The team weas based at the now-defunct Somerton Park stadium, which was also the home of football and greyhound racing. The tight speedway track meant that turf had to be brought on to make the corner flag area for football matches and removed once the match had finished.

The 'Wasps' nickname was dropped after 1972 with the team simply called Newport. Stars of the former team included Australian Phil Crump, father of world champion Jason Crump. The team finished third during the 1975 British League season. The promotion and riders moved to Bristol in 1977 as the Bristol Bulldogs but speedway continued at Somerton Park for one more season after dropping down to the National League in 1977, at which point they rode as the Newport Dragons for one season.

1997–2011
The modern incarnation of the team was founded in 1997, when the Wasps entered the Premier League and the junior side called the Western Warriors (a combined team from Newport and Exeter competed in the Conference League. The teams were based at the purpose built Hayley Stadium. The following season (1998) a junior side known as the Newport Mavericks joined the Conference League and then won the 1999 Speedway Conference League.

The Wasps continued to compete in the Premier League until the early part of the 2008 season when they withdrew because their promoter Tim Stone died only to be saved by the Mallett family and rebranded for the 2009 season (including a junior side called the Newport Hornets) with Steve Mallett at the helm and his son Nick Mallett joining him as the youngest promoter in British speedway history. The 2009 season saw the Hornets win the national league pairs with the pairing of veteran Tony Atkin and New Zealander Grant Tregoning. The following season Newport beat Somerset for the Severn Bridge trophy and the Hornets finished third in the National league, losing out on the title by points difference.

The Wasps last season ended with a trophy, they won the 2011 Premier League Knock-Out Cup defeating Glasgow in the final.

After a disagreement with the BSPA and ring wood raceway deciding not to follow up plans to run stock cars and destroying the previous fence the club was put up for sale but after talks with the only interested party, Phil Morris, an agreement could not be reached and on 17 February 2012 promoter Steve Mallett confirmed the club would fold with immediate effect. The club shortly after was vandalised and the victim of an arson attack which devastated the stadium leading to it being demolished and redeveloped by owners MCL and speedway was lost to the city once again.

Season summary

Season summary (juniors)

Riders previous seasons

2009 Team
 
 
 
 
 
 
 

2008 Team
 
 
 
 
 
 
 

2007 Team

2006 Team

References

Speedway Premier League teams
Sport in Newport, Wales
Defunct British speedway teams